El Almi Daoudi (born September 26, 1985 in Tébessa) is an Algerian footballer. He currently plays for MC El Eulma in the Algerian Ligue Professionnelle 1.

External links
 DZFoot Profile
 

1985 births
Living people
People from Tébessa
Algerian footballers
Algerian Ligue Professionnelle 1 players
AS Khroub players
MC Alger players
MC El Eulma players
Association football midfielders
21st-century Algerian people